Lusenda refugee camp is a Burundian refugee camp in the vicinity of Bukavu.

The camp opened in 2015, and is operated by the United Nations High Commissioner for Refugees.

References 

Bukavu
2015 establishments in the Democratic Republic of the Congo
Refugee camps in Africa
United Nations High Commissioner for Refugees
Burundian diaspora